The 1947 Oklahoma A&M Cowboys football team represented Oklahoma Agricultural and Mechanical College (later renamed Oklahoma State University–Stillwater) in the Missouri Valley Conference during the 1947 college football season. In their ninth year under head coach Jim Lookabaugh, the Cowboys compiled a 3–7 record (0–2 against conference opponents), finished in last place in the conference, and were outscored by opponents by a combined total of 134 to 116.

The team's statistical leaders included halfback Jim Spavital with 411 rushing yards and 36 points scored, Bob Cook with 188 passing yards, and Don Van Pool with 92 receiving yards.

No Oklahoma A&M players received first-team All-Missouri Valley Conference honors in 1947.

The team played its home games at Lewis Field in Stillwater, Oklahoma.

Schedule

After the season

The 1948 NFL Draft was held on December 19, 1947. The following Cowboys were selected.

References

Oklahoma AandM
Oklahoma State Cowboys football seasons
Oklahoma AandM